von Schlebrügge is a German surname. Notable people with the surname include:

Hans von Schlebrügge (1900–1971), German military officer
Max von Schlebrügge (born 1977), Swedish footballer
Nena von Schlebrügge (born 1941), Mexican model